Johnny Rabb (born February 29, 1972) is an American drummer, author, inventor, and teacher.

Life and career
As a product specialist for Roland V-DRUMS, Rabb has performed around 70 international clinic dates per year. He endorses several companies including: Mapex Drums, Remo, Audix Microphones, Prologix, Blowit Fans, Drumometer, and HansenFutz. Rabb designed a series of cymbals with the MEINL company: Drumbals and Safari cymbals are part of  MEINL's Generation X line. Rabb designed a signature stick, TX7731W, for Pro-Mark drumsticks.

In 2006, Rabb and Clay Parnell formed the band BioDiesel, described as "environmentally friendly Intelligent Dance Music". Rabb is the drummer for U.S.S.A., a rock n' roll collaboration with bassist/programmer/producer Paul Barker, guitarist/composer Duane Denison, and lead singer Gary Call.  Rabb formed the duo DrumJockeys with percussionist Chris Patterson (DJ Krushar) performing drum n' bass and acid jazz. Rabb also plays in Magnetic Lobster with friend Marco Minnemann.

Rabb held the title of "WFD World's Fastest Drummer Extreme Sport Drumming" by playing 1,071 single strokes in 60 seconds.

Collective Soul
Rabb became the drummer for Collective Soul in 2012, making his first live performances with the band during their Dosage Tour between May to July. Rabb's debut studio album with Collective Soul, See What You Started by Continuing, was released on October 2, 2015.

Bibliography
(2001). Jungle/Drum 'n' Bass for the Acoustic Drum Set: A Guide to Applying Today's Electronic Music to the Drum Set. Alfred. .

Discography

With Collective Soul

Studio albums
 See What You Started by Continuing (2015)
 Blood (2019)

See also
List of drummers

References

1972 births
Alternative rock drummers
American alternative rock musicians
American male drummers
American music educators
American rock drummers
Collective Soul members
Living people
Musicians from Virginia
People from Fairfax, Virginia
20th-century American drummers
21st-century American drummers